Woodlands is a small town in the Southland region of New Zealand's South Island on the banks of the Waihopai River.  It is northeast of Invercargill between Dacre and Longbush. Other nearby settlements are Rakahouka to the northwest and Rimu and Waituna to the south.

Demographics 
It is part of the wider Edendale-Woodlands statistical area.

Woodlands had a population of 273 at the 2018 New Zealand census, an increase of 12 people (4.6%) since the 2013 census, and an increase of 18 people (7.1%) since the 2006 census. There were 111 households. There were 141 males and 135 females, giving a sex ratio of 1.04 males per female, with 51 people (18.7%) aged under 15 years, 39 (14.3%) aged 15 to 29, 144 (52.7%) aged 30 to 64, and 42 (15.4%) aged 65 or older.

Ethnicities were 87.9% European/Pākehā, 12.1% Māori, 1.1% Pacific peoples, and 7.7% Asian (totals add to more than 100% since people could identify with multiple ethnicities).

Although some people objected to giving their religion, 46.2% had no religion, 45.1% were Christian and 3.3% had other religions.

Of those at least 15 years old, 27 (12.2%) people had a bachelor or higher degree, and 54 (24.3%) people had no formal qualifications. The employment status of those at least 15 was that 132 (59.5%) people were employed full-time, 33 (14.9%) were part-time, and 12 (5.4%) were unemployed.

Transport 
The town is located on State Highway 1 and the Main South Line portion of the South Island Main Trunk Railway. The railway has been freight-only since the cancellation of the Southerner passenger express on 10 February 2002. During the construction of the Main South Line, Woodlands was briefly a railway terminus. The first section of the line out of Invercargill was opened to Woodlands on 11 February 1874. On 7 June 1875, the next section beyond Woodlands was opened to Mataura via Edendale.

War memorial 
A number of Woodlands residents fought overseas in World War I. A memorial to those who died stands in the town.

Education
Woodlands Full Primary School caters for years 1 to 8 with a roll of  students as of  The school opened in 1871.

References 

Populated places in Southland, New Zealand